Helen W. Gillmor (born 1942) is a senior United States district judge of the United States District Court for the District of Hawaii.

Early life and education
Born in Syracuse, New York, Gillmor received a Bachelor of Arts degree from Queens College, City University of New York in 1965, and a Bachelor of Laws from Boston University School of Law in 1968.

Career
Gillmor was in private practice in Boston, Massachusetts from 1968 to 1969, and in El Paso, Texas in 1969. She was a lecturer at the  International Legal Center of the United States Agency for International Development, in Seoul, South Korea from 1969 to 1970, returning to private practice in Camden, Maine in 1970, and in Honolulu, Hawaii from 1971 to 1972, 1974 to 1977, and 1985 to 1994. She was a law clerk to William S. Richardson, Chief Justice of the Hawaii State Supreme Court in 1972, a deputy public defender of the Honolulu Office of the Public Defender from 1972 to 1974, and a lecturer at the University of Hawaii in 1975. She was a district court judge of the Hawaii State Family Court, First Circuit from 1977 to 1983, and of the District Court of Hawaii for the same circuit from 1983 to 1985.

Federal judicial service
On August 25, 1994, Gillmor was nominated by President Bill Clinton to a new seat on the United States District Court for the District of Hawaii created by 104 Stat. 5089. She was confirmed by the United States Senate on October 7, 1994, and received her commission on October 11, 1994. She became chief judge in 2005. She assumed senior status on June 30, 2009.

In November 2012, Gillmor found that Hawaii's licensing requirement to openly carry firearms did not violate the Second Amendment to the United States Constitution.  Her judgment was then reversed by a divided panel of the United States Court of Appeals for the Ninth Circuit in July 2018.

References

Sources 

1942 births
Living people
American women lawyers
American lawyers
Hawaii state court judges
Judges of the United States District Court for the District of Hawaii
United States district court judges appointed by Bill Clinton
Lawyers from Syracuse, New York
Queens College, City University of New York alumni
Boston University School of Law alumni
Public defenders
20th-century American judges
21st-century American judges
20th-century American women judges
21st-century American women judges